Balqees Ahmed Fathi (born October 20, 1988), widely known by the mononym Balqees, is an Emirati singer and actress hailing from Yemen. She came from an artistic family as her father Ahmed Fathi was a well-known Yemeni musician and her mother is a Yemeni who is a citizen of the UAE.

Career
Balqees began early in music learning to play instruments and singing. She released her debut album Majnoun in 2013 through Rotana Records. She released her second studio album Zai Ma Ana in 2015.

She released a music video World Chants Zayed as a theme dedicated for 40th National Day Celebration of United Arab Emirates. She graduated from Abu Dhabi University.

On October 20, 2019, she unveiled her star on the walkway of the Dubai Stars at downtown Dubai. In October 2022, she was chosen to feature in Light The Sky, a song for the 2022 FIFA World Cup in Qatar, collaborating with artists, RedOne, Manal, Rahma Riad and Nora Fatehi.

Personal life
Balqees married Saudi Arabian businessman Sultan Bin Abdullatif in 2016, with whom she had a son. She filed for divorce in 2021.

In August 2021, she unveiled her wax figure at Madame Tussauds in Dubai.

Discography

Studio albums 
 Majnoun (2013)
 Zai Ma Ana (2015)
 Arahenkom (2017)

Singles 

 "Masala Sahla" (2011)
 "Al Shear Diwan" (2011)
 "Ya Hawa" (2012)
 "Ana Radhi" (2014)
 "Beyrq Al Azz" (2014)
 "Ya Alamna" (2014)
 "Ya Rafeeqat Omri" (2015)
 "Zaffet Abdullah Wa Lujain" (2016)
 "Mouchtag La 'inak" (2016)
 "Khalina" (2016)
 "Shaltari" (2016)
 "Kol Al Kawakeb" (2016)
 "Ala Zeker Al Nabi Sallo (Zaffa)" (2016)
 "Wayyak Khedni" (2016)
 "Kheel Al Qaseed" (2016)
 "Doq Al Qaa Daqaah" (2017)
 "Ajras Al Walah" (2017)
 "Romana (Music from the Original TV Series)" (2017)
 "Ana Al Alam" (2017)
 "Aam Alkheir" (2017)
 "Elbesy Thawbek Alabyad" (2018)
 "Ahlan Ya Mama" (2018)
 "Shofli Hal" (2018)
 "Galow Ashyaa" (2018)
 "Aresna" (2019)
 "Ana Ma Aateqed" (2019)
 "La Taleeq" (2019)
 "Bent Zayed" (2019)
 "Taala Tchouf" (2019)
 "Ya Galbi" (2020)
 "La Vie Is Good" (feat. DJ Youcef) (2020)
 "Bahr Rikbah Ghalahm - Nas Ghazer Mahum" (2020)
 "Haza Malekona" (2020)
 "Najmah Wa Ghmamah" (2020)
 "Ya Tair Al Hob" (2020)
 "Ya Qamar Ya Yamani (Cover)" (2020)
 "Hala Jdeeda" (feat. Queen G) [Dodom] (2021)
 "Khaf Alayi" (2021)
 "Momken" (feat. Saif Nabeel) (2021)
 "Entaha" (2021)
 "Jabbar" (2021)
 "Diplomacy" (2021)
 "Janoub Al Darb" (2021)
 "Khamseen" (2021)
 "Sabra" (2022)

References 

Emirati women singers
Yemeni women singers
1988 births
Living people
21st-century Yemeni women
21st-century Emirati women
21st-century Yemeni people
21st-century Emirati people
21st-century women singers
Emirati people of Yemeni descent
Naturalized citizens of the United Arab Emirates
Emirati film actresses
Fifa World Cup ceremonies performers
21st-century Yemeni women singers